Bec d'Epicoune or Becca Rayette  is a mountain of the Pennine Alps, located on the Swiss-Italian border. On its northern side it overlooks the Otemma Glacier. On the Swisstopo map, Becca Rayette is the name of a 3,432 m sub-peak on the SW spur neighboring the 3,320 m Col de la Rayette, rather than an alternative name for the main summit. Likewise, Becca Picion is a 3,389 sub-summit on the ENE ridge towards the 3,233 m Col d'Epicoune.

References

External links
 Bec d'Epicoune on Hikr

Mountains of the Alps
Alpine three-thousanders
Mountains of Switzerland
Mountains of Aosta Valley
Italy–Switzerland border
International mountains of Europe
Mountains of Valais